The Pompeii Lakshmi is an ivory statuette that was discovered in the ruins of Pompeii, a Roman city destroyed in the eruption of Mount Vesuvius 79 CE. It was found by Amedeo Maiuri, an Italian scholar, in 1938. The statuette has been dated to the first-century CE. The statuette is thought of as representing an Indian goddess of feminine beauty and fertility. It is possible that the sculpture originally formed the handle of a mirror. The yakshi is evidence of commercial trade between India and Rome in the first century CE. 

Originally, it was thought that the statuette represented the goddess Lakshmi, a goddess of fertility, beauty and wealth, revered by early Hindus, Buddhists and Jains. However, the iconography, in particular the exposed genitals, reveals that the figure is more likely to depict a yakshi, a female tree spirit that represents fertility, or possibly a syncretic version of Venus-Sri-Lakshmi from an ancient exchange between Classical Greco-Roman and Indian cultures.

The figure is now in the Secret Museum in the Naples National Archaeological Museum.

Contents 

The statuette was discovered in October 1938 beside the Casa dei Quattro stili at Pompeii. Based on its architectural remains and floor plan, this "House of the Four Styles," directly off of the Via dell'Abbondanza, is now believed to have belonged to a successful merchant. It is crammed with luxurious Indian commodities, suggesting that Romans in the first century CE had a fascination with antiquities not just from Greece but also from remote cultures, and that Romans had a desire to acquire objects they considered exotic. 

Standing at 0.25 m. high the statuette is nearly naked apart from her narrow girdle and lavish jewels as well as an elaborate coiffure. She has two female attendants, one facing outward on each side, holding cosmetics containers. The statuette has a hole bored down from the top of her head. There is the theory that its purpose may have been a mirror handle.

The existence of this statuette in Pompeii by 79 CE, when Mount Vesuvius erupted and buried the city, testifies to the intensity of Indo-Roman trade relations during the 1st century CE. This statuette has been dated by the Naples National Archaeological Museum as having been created in India in the first half of that century.

Trade 

Though the origin is not entirely certain, based on archeological finds and historian work, the Pompeii Lakshmi has had a questionable origin. There is evidence of the then active trade routes between the Roman Empire under Emperor Nero and India during this time period. According to Pollard, with the Roman long-distance trade, she is believed to have found herself in the city during the reign of Augustus. The archeological evidence suggests that the height of trade between Roman and India appears to have been the first and second centuries CE. This trade took place along several routes, both overland as documented by Isidore of Charax’s Parthian Stations, and by sea as the merchant guide known as the Periplus Maris Erythraei reveals.

There is a possibility that the statuette found its way to the west during the rule of Western Satrap Nahapana in the Bhokardan area, and was shipped from the port of Barigaza.

Rome played an important part in the Eastern oriental trade of antiquity, they imported many goods from India and at the same time set up their own trading stations in the country. According to Cobb, trading through land routes such as crossing the Arabian Peninsula and Mesopotamia, and through seaborne trade from the Red Sea and the Indian Ocean were used by the Romans.

The wealth of the trade was significant enough for Pliny to claim that 100 million sesterces were being sent annually to India, China, and Arabia. With shipments of nard, ivory, and textiles it is clear from the archaeological evidence, that Roman trade with the East peaked in the first and second centuries CE. This time period also witnessed a material shift among Roman craftsmanship, which rapidly began to favor imported ivory over traditional bone for use in furniture, musical instruments, accessories, and more. The insatiable desire for artisan ivory work even led to the creation of a politically powerful guild of Roman ivory workers: the Eborarii.

Origin

It was initially assumed that the statuette had been produced at Mathura, but according to Dhavalikar, it is now thought that its place of production was Bhokardan since two similar figurines were discovered there. Bhokardan was a part of the Satavahana territory and cultural sphere, although it might have been held for a few decades by the Western Satraps, who may have been the ones who provided an export route to the Roman world.

There is also an inscriptive mark in Kharosthi at the base of the Pompeii statuette (the letter śi, as the śi in Shiva). This suggests she might have originated from the northwestern regions of India, Pakistan, or Afghanistan, or at least passed through these areas. Since the Pompeii statuette was necessarily made sometime before 79 CE, if it was indeed manufactured in Gandhara, it would suggest that the Begram ivories are also of this early date, in the 1st century CE.

Iconography
The statuette is represented in the round, and the center of two other female figures. The legs are turned to its side and one arm bent to hold earrings. She is presumed to only be looked at from the front because the details from the back are very flat. As stated by D’Ancona, the iconography falls into the broad category of female deities in India.

In a case of cross-cultural pollination, the theme of the goddess attended by two child attendants, which can be seen in the case of the Pompeii Lakshmi, is an uncommon depiction of Lakshmi or Yashis in Indian art. It lacks the lotus flower found in Lakshmi iconography. According to D'Ancona, the iconography represented in this statuette may have been imported from the Classical world, possibly derived from the iconography of Venus attended by cherubs holding cosmetics containers, which are well known in Greco-Roman art. She may be one of the several representations of Venus-Sri-Lakshmi that appeared in the 1st century CE, states D'Ancona. Another example of this common Roman representation of Venus attended by cupids can be seen in the Los Angeles Getty Villa's "Imitation of a Statuette of a Female Reclining on a Couch with Erotes." The extreme ornamentation of this statuette and the semi-nudity of the female figure are both reminiscent of the Pompeii Lakshmi. Syncretism between Roman and foreign deities was not uncommon, especially with Egyptian deities like Isis and Osiris. In Pompeii, the Romanization of deities (Interpretatio Romana) could absolutely explain the seeming mixture of Indian and Classical art present in the Pompeii Lakshmi.

An early relief from Sanchi Stupa No.2 with a broadly similar scene of Lakshmi with two child attendants may have served as the initial inspiration for the Pompeii Lakshmi, especially knowing that the Satavahanas were in control of Sanchi from 50 BCE onward. It is thought that these early reliefs at Sanchi Stupa No.2 were made by craftsmen from the northwest, specifically from the Indo-Greek region of Gandhara, as the reliefs bear mason's marks in Kharoshthi, as opposed to the local Brahmi script. The craftsmen were probably responsible for the foreign-looking motifs and figures that can be found on the railings of the stupa.

See also

Sator Square, discovered at Pompeii

References

External links
 Comparative images of Bhokardan, Ter and Pompeii statuettes in Pompeii Laxmi and Twin Sister from Bhokardan

1st-century artifacts
1938 archaeological discoveries
Cultural history of Maharashtra
Foreign relations of ancient India
Foreign relations of ancient Rome
Indian sculpture
Ivory works of art
Lakshmi
Pompeii (ancient city)
Indian Buddhist sculpture
Religious syncretism
Sculptures of goddesses
Sculptures of mythology
Sculptures of Venus
Sculptures of women
Statues in Italy
India–Italy relations
Yakshas